Jurandir Dário Gouveia Damasceno dos Santos, commonly known as Dário or Dário Alegria, (5 April 1944 – 9 October 2021) was a footballer who played as a forward for several clubs in the Campeonato Brasileiro Série A and the Mexican Primera División. He also participated in the Brazil national team.

Career
Born in Paracatu, Minas Gerais, Dário Alegria's father, Luiz, died when Dário was only age 14. His family moved to Brasília, where Dário would be invited to play for CR Vasco da Gama's youth team. He began playing professional football with América Futebol Clube in 1964.

In 1965, Dário Alegria joined Sociedade Esportiva Palmeiras. He would win the 1967 Campeonato Brasileiro with Palmeiras, making him the first player from Paracatu to win a national championship. In 1968, he moved to Mexico to play for C.F. Monterrey for six months before returning to Brazil with Fluminense Football Club.

Dário Alegria won state championships in 1966 (Campeonato Paulista with Palmeiras) and 1971 (Campeonato Mineiro with América) and had brief stints with Clube de Regatas do Flamengo, Botafogo de Ribeirão Preto, Associação Atlética Caldense, Villa Nova Atlético Clube and Olaria Atlético Clube, before he finished his career with Centro de Ensino Unificado de Brasília Esporte Clube.

Dário Alegria made his only appearance for the Brazil national team in a friendly against Uruguay on 7 September 1965.

References

External links

1944 births
2021 deaths
Sportspeople from Minas Gerais
Brazilian footballers
Association football forwards
Brazil international footballers
América Futebol Clube (MG) players
Sociedade Esportiva Palmeiras players
Fluminense FC players
CR Flamengo footballers
Botafogo Futebol Clube (SP) players
C.F. Monterrey players
Liga MX players
Brazilian expatriate footballers
Brazilian expatriate sportspeople in Mexico
Expatriate footballers in Mexico